Nie Bichu (2 January 1928 – 20 April 2018) was a Chinese politician. He served as Mayor and acting Party Secretary of Tianjin.

Biography
Nie was born in Tianjin in 1928, with his ancestral home in Hunan Province. He studied at Yaohua School in Tianjin from 1935 to 1946, and graduated from Beiyang University (now Tianjin University) in 1950. He had four siblings, two of whom died early. He joined the Communist Party of China in 1948 and was a member of its 13th Central Committee.

Nie served as mayor of Tianjin from October 1989 to June 1993 and Chairman of Tianjin People's Congress from June 1993 to May 1998. When Tan Shaowen, Party Secretary of Tianjin, died in February 1993, Nie served as acting Party Secretary for a month before Gao Dezhan was appointed as Tan's replacement. In the early 1990s, he successfully lobbied the central government to allow Tianjin to implement housing reform after the example of Shanghai.

Nie died on 20 April 2018 at the age of 90.

References 

1928 births
2018 deaths
People's Republic of China politicians from Tianjin
Mayors of Tianjin
Yaohua High School alumni
Tianjin University alumni
Members of the 13th Central Committee of the Chinese Communist Party